Getting Mary Married is a 1919 silent American comedy film directed by Allan Dwan and starring Marion Davies. It was distributed by the Select Pictures Corporation.

Cast
Marion Davies as Mary Bussard
Norman Kerry as James Winthrop
Matt Moore as Ted Barnacle
Frederick Burton as Amos Bussard
Amelia Summerville as Mrs. Bussard
Elmer Grandin as John Bussard
Constance Beaumar as Mathilda Bussard
Helen Lindroth as Mrs. Winthrop

Plot
Marion Davies stars as a young woman who is left a fortune but only if she can fulfill her step-father's will by remaining unmarried and living with his brother Amos' family for a year. Of course if Mary refuses or is unable to do so the fortune instead goes to Amos and he has been waiting years for a chance at his brother's money. Amos has his plans to get the money and when handsome bachelor James Winthrop shows, up Mary things become even more complicated.

Production
In her 5th film Marion Davies stars in this romantic comedy. This was Davies' first light comedy role and her first film with director Alan Dwan. Reviews were good. Variety stated it was Davies best film to date. Dwan remembered that although Davies stuttered and stammered, she was just fine once the cameras were rolling. This is the earliest extant Marion Davies film.

Status
The film exists in the Library of Congress collection. A DVD was released by Edward Lorusso thru Grapevine Video.

References

External links

1919 films
American silent feature films
American black-and-white films
Silent American comedy films
1919 comedy films
Films directed by Allan Dwan
1910s American films